Polynoncus neuquen is a species of hide beetle in the subfamily Omorginae found in Argentina and Chile.

References

neuquen
Beetles described in 1962
Beetles of South America